Jette Ryde Gottlieb (born 23 September 1948 in Copenhagen) is a Danish politician, who is a member of the Folketing for the Red-Green Alliance political party. She was elected into parliament at the 2019 Danish general election, and was previously represented in the Folketing from 1994 to 2001.

Political career
Gottlieb has previously been a member of the Left Socialists. She was among the people who took part in founding the Red-Green Alliance in 1988-1989.

Gottlieb was first elected into parliament at the 1994 election, and was reelected in the 1998 election. She didn't run for parliament again at the 2001 election. She ran again in the 2015 election, where she was elected as a substitute member for the Red-Green Alliance in the Copenhagen constituency. She acted as substitute for Finn Sørensen from 17 April to 10 June in 2018. In the 2019 election she was elected into parliament for the Red-Green Alliance.

Personal life
Gottlieb is a carpenter by trade.

External links 
 Biography on the website of the Danish Parliament (Folketinget)

References 

Living people
1948 births
Politicians from Copenhagen
Danish carpenters
Women carpenters
Red–Green Alliance (Denmark) politicians
Women members of the Folketing
Members of the Folketing 1994–1998
Members of the Folketing 1998–2001
Members of the Folketing 2019–2022
Members of the Folketing 2022–2026
21st-century Danish women politicians
20th-century Danish women